Gloria Escoffery OD (22 December 1923 – 24 April 2002) was a Jamaican painter, poet and art critic active in the 1940s and 1950s.

Biography
Born in Gayle, Saint Mary Parish, Jamaica, the youngest of three children of Dr. William T. Escoffery, medical officer, and his wife Sylvia, Escoffery attended St Hilda's High School, Brown's Town. In 1942 she won the Island Scholarship and went to McGill University in Montreal, Quebec, Canada, and subsequently studied in England at the Slade School of Fine Arts (1950–52), and the University of the West Indies's School of Education.

Having held her first solo exhibition in Kingston in 1944, Escoffery exhibited extensively in Jamaica and elsewhere. Her works feature in many public and private collections.

In 1977 she was awarded the Order of Distinction and the Silver Musgrave Medal from the Institute of Jamaica in 1985.

Publications
 Landscape in the Making (a pamphlet, 1976)
 Loggerhead (Sandberry Press, 1988)  
 Mother Jackson Murders the Moon (Peepal Tree Press, 1998)

References 

Jamaican women painters
Recipients of the Musgrave Medal
Recipients of the Order of Distinction
1923 births
2002 deaths
20th-century Jamaican painters
20th-century women artists
Jamaican artists
Expatriates from the Colony of Jamaica in Canada
Migrants from British Jamaica to the United Kingdom